Hong Jeong-Ho (born May 6, 1974 in Jeju Province, South Korea) is a retired South Korean team handball player, Olympic and World champion. She is now based in Seoul and is involved in youth handball and also an expert commentator on TV.

International career
She received gold medal at the 1992 Summer Olympics in Barcelona, playing for the Korean national team. She received a silver medal at the 1996 Summer Olympics in Atlanta. She received a bronze medal at the 2008 Summer Olympics in Beijing. In total she played 18 matches in her three Olympic games and scored a total of 77 goals. With her national team she also won the 1995 World Women's Handball Championship.

Club career
During her career she played for the Norwegian club Bækkelagets SK, Danish club Slagelse FH and Japanese club Omron Handball. She won the Women's EHF Cup Winners' Cup in 1998/1999 with Bækkelagets SK and the Women's EHF Cup with Slagelse FH in 2002/2003. With Bækkelagets SK she won the Norwegian League in 1998 and with Slagelse FH she won the Danish championship in 2002/2003.

Individual honors
 Top scorer of the 1993 World Women's Handball Championship with 58 goals.
 All Star Team, Best Right Back: 1996 Summer Olympics
 South Korea's top scorer at 2008 Summer Olympics with 44 goals

References

1974 births
Living people
South Korean female handball players
Olympic handball players of South Korea
Handball players at the 1992 Summer Olympics
Handball players at the 1996 Summer Olympics
Handball players at the 2008 Summer Olympics
Olympic gold medalists for South Korea
Olympic silver medalists for South Korea
Olympic bronze medalists for South Korea
Olympic medalists in handball
Medalists at the 2008 Summer Olympics
Asian Games medalists in handball
Handball players at the 1994 Asian Games
Medalists at the 1996 Summer Olympics
Medalists at the 1992 Summer Olympics
Asian Games gold medalists for South Korea
Expatriate handball players
Medalists at the 1994 Asian Games
South Korean expatriate sportspeople in Denmark
South Korean expatriate sportspeople in Norway
South Korean expatriate sportspeople in Japan